Mauro Alegre  (born 8 January 1988) is an Argentine footballer. He is an attacking midfielder.

Alegre began his football career with little-known Argentine club Atlético Villa Alvear. At the age of 18 years he moved to Europe and signed a professional contract with Bulgarian club Botev Plovdiv. In 2007 the midfielder was loaned for six months to Swiss football club AC Lugano. In February 2011, Alegre joined Chorrillo F.C. in Panama.

References

1988 births
Living people
Argentine footballers
Association football midfielders
Botev Plovdiv players
First Professional Football League (Bulgaria) players